Hokuto may refer to:

Hokuto Shichisei or the Big Dipper, the Japanese name for the asterism
Hokuto (train) the name of train services operating in Hokkaido, Japan
Hokuto Corporation, a Tokyo-based Japanese adult video company
Hokuto (Street Fighter), a character in the Street Fighter EX video game series
Hokuto no Ken or Fist of the North Star, the title refers primarily to "Hokuto Shinken", a deadly martial art school
Hokuto Bank, a Japanese bank headquartered in Akita

Places 
Hokuto, Yamanashi, a city in Yamanashi Prefecture, Japan
Hokuto, Hokkaido, a city in Hokkaido, Japan

People 
, Japanese retired professional wrestler
, Ainu waka poet and social activist
Hokuto Konishi (born 1984), contestant on So You Think You Can Dance and a band member
, Japanese actor and singer
, Japanese footballer
, Japanese professional wrestler 
, Japanese footballer
, Japanese politician
, Japanese singer, performer and actor

Characters 
Hokuto, a character from B'TX
Hokuto Sumeragi, a character in Tokyo Babylon and X/1999 
Hokuto Dan, or Dyna Red, a character from Kagaku Sentai Dynaman
Seiji Hokuto, Ultraman Aces alter ego alongside Yuko Minami from the 1972 namesake tokusatsu
Hokuto Kaneshiro, a character from Rosario + Vampire
Hokuto, a character from Street Fighter EX
Hokuto Furukizu, a character in the video game Yandere Simulator

Japanese masculine given names